Shenzhen Airlines is an airline headquartered in Shenzhen Bao'an International Airport in Bao'an District, Shenzhen, Guangdong. It has been a member of Star Alliance since 2012, and is currently one of two Chinese airlines that are members.

The carrier operates a total of 137 domestic airport-pairs involving 58 Chinese airports, plus nine international routes. In 2010, the airline carried 16.5 million passengers, up 9% on the previous year.

Corporate affairs

The airline had its headquarters in the Lintian Building at Shenzhen Airport.

Destinations

Codeshare agreements
Shenzhen Airlines has codeshare agreements with the following airlines:

 Air China
 Air Macau
 All Nippon Airways
 Asiana Airlines 
 Cathay Pacific
 EVA Air
 Kunming Airlines
 Shandong Airlines
 Sichuan Airlines
 Singapore Airlines
 Tibet Airlines
 Turkish Airlines
 Uni Air

Fleet
, Shenzhen Airlines operates the following aircraft:

See also
Henan Airlines
Jade Cargo International (historical)

References

External links

Official website 
Global website
Boland, Rory. "Shenzhen Airlines Profile." About.com Travel.

Airlines of China
Chinese brands
Chinese companies established in 1992
Airlines established in 1992
Companies based in Shenzhen
Star Alliance
Air China
Bao'an District